Turbonilla nivea is a species of sea snail, a marine gastropod mollusk in the family Pyramidellidae, the pyrams and their allies.

Description
The shell grows to a length of 7 mm.

Distribution
This species occurs in the following locations:
 Caribbean Sea
 Lesser Antilles
 Atlantic Ocean (Cobscook Bay, Gulf of Maine to Central Brazil)

Notes
Additional information regarding this species:
 Distribution: Range: 45°N to 24°S; 75°W to 45°W. Distribution: Canada; Canada: Prince Edward Island (from the northern tip of Miscou Island, N.B. to Cape Breton Island south of Chéticamp, including the Northumberland Strait and Georges Bay to the Canso Strait causeway), New Brunswick; USA: Maine, Massachusetts, New York, North Carolina; Virgin Islands: St. Croix; Brazil; Brazil: São Paulo
 Habitat: intertidal and infralittoral of the Gulf and estuary

References

External links
 To Biodiversity Heritage Library (33 publications)
 To Encyclopedia of Life
 To USNM Invertebrate Zoology Mollusca Collection
 To ITIS
 To World Register of Marine Species

nivea
Gastropods described in 1851